Peter Timothy Zaremba (April 7, 1908 – September 17, 1994) was an American athlete who competed mainly in the hammer throw.  He was born and raised in the Pittsburgh area steel town of Aliquippa, Pennsylvania. He competed for the United States in the 1932 Summer Olympics held in Los Angeles, United States in the hammer throw where he won the bronze medal. He graduated from NYU with an engineering degree.

References

External links
 

1908 births
1994 deaths
American male hammer throwers
Olympic bronze medalists for the United States in track and field
Athletes (track and field) at the 1932 Summer Olympics
Sportspeople from Pennsylvania
Polytechnic Institute of New York University alumni
Medalists at the 1932 Summer Olympics